Solitreo is a cursive form of the Hebrew alphabet. Traditionally a Sephardi script, it is the predecessor of modern cursive Hebrew of Ashkenazi origin currently used for handwriting in modern Israel and for Yiddish. The two forms differ from each other primarily in that Solitreo uses far more typographic ligatures than the Ashkenazi script.

Historically, Solitreo served as the standard handwritten form of Judeo-español in the Balkans and Turkey, that complemented the Rashi script character set used for printing. In Sephardi communities in the Maghreb and the Levant, it was used for Hebrew and Judeo-Arabic manuscripts. While both the Balkan and Maghrebine-Levantine forms are called Solitreo, they are quite distinctive and readers familiar with one type may find the other difficult to read.

With the decline of Judaeo-Spanish and the dispersion of Sephardic population centres, examples of Solitreo have become scarce. The February 2012 digitization of a Jewish merchant's memoir from late 19th century Thessaloniki, Ottoman Empire by scholars from Stanford University provided a new, high-quality resource for scholars of Judaeo-Spanish and Solitreo.

Comparison with square Hebrew

References

External links

A guide to the Ladino language
LadinoType - A Ladino Transliteration System for Solitreo, Meruba, and Rashi
Documenting Judeo-Spanish

Judaeo-Spanish